Don Benjamin Manalo (born July 30, 1995), known professionally as Benj Manalo, is a Filipino actor and professional dancer who is best known for his role as Pinggoy in the top-rated prime time series FPJ's Ang Probinsyano. He also appeared in other shows like On the Wings of Love, My Super D and Kadenang Ginto.

He is the second son of comedian and TV host Jose Manalo and brother of Nicco Manalo.

In 2018, he celebrated his 3rd anniversary with his girlfriend 'Bubble Gang' comedienne Lovely Abella. He also won the Best Actor trophy at the CentroMedia FilmFest 2018.

In June 2019, he proposed to  Abella. In January 23, 2021, the couple tied their knot at Lemuria Gourmet Restaurant in Quezon City.

Filmography

Television

Film

References

External links

Living people
1995 births
Place of birth missing (living people)
Filipino male television actors
Filipino male dancers
Filipino male musical theatre actors
Male soap opera actors